FK Pěnčín-Turnov is a Czech football club located in Turnov. It currently plays in Divize C, which is in the Czech Fourth Division. In 2004, two clubs, FK Pěnčín, who had been playing in the regional championship, and Turnov, who had previously played in the Czech 2. Liga under the names FC Agro and SK Český Ráj, merged to form FK Pěnčín-Turnov.

References

External links
  

Football clubs in the Czech Republic
Association football clubs established in 2004
Sport in the Liberec Region
2004 establishments in the Czech Republic
Semily District